Jared Green (born April 1, 1989) is a former American football wide receiver in the National Football League (NFL). He is the founder and CEO of Engage 365 LLC as well as The Green Dream nonprofit (501c3). Green played college football for Southern University and for the University of Virginia He signed with the Carolina Panthers as an undrafted free agent in 2012. He had brief stints with the Panthers, Dallas Cowboys and Oakland Raiders before retiring from professional football in 2014 to pursue his business and philanthropic dreams.

Early years
Green attended Oakton High School in Vienna, Virginia.

College career
Green played college football at the University of Virginia from 2008 to 2010. He transferred from Virginia to Southern for his senior year and the 2011 football season. He finished his college career with 52 receptions, 670 receiving yards and four receiving touchdowns.

In his freshman year at Virginia, Green played in 12 games had 12 receptions, 144 receiving yards and one receiving touchdown. On November 1, 2008, he had three receptions for 25 yards and a touchdown against Miami in which Virginia lost the game in Overtime 24-17.
 
In his sophomore year, he played in 11 games in which he recorded 15 receptions, 104 receiving yards and no touchdowns. On September 5, 2009, he had three receptions for 28 yards in a loss against William & Mary. On September 19, 2009, he had 4 receptions for 18 yards in a loss against Southern Mississippi.
 
In his junior year, he played in 11 games and recorded 8 receptions, 95 receiving yards and one receiving touchdown. On September 25, 2010, he recorded four receptions for 63 yards and a touchdown against Virginia Military Institute in which Virginia wins the game 48-7.

In his senior year at Southern, he played in 11 games and started in three of them. He finished the season with 17 receptions, 307 receiving yards and two receiving touchdowns. On October 15, 2011, he had a career-high 7 receptions, career high 141 receiving yards and one touchdown against Arkansas-Pine Bluff but Southern lost 22-21.

Professional career

Carolina Panthers
Green went undrafted in the 2012 NFL Draft. On May 11, 2012, he signed with Carolina Panthers as an undrafted free agent. On August 31, 2012, he was released. On September 1, 2012, he was re-signed to the practice squad.

Dallas Cowboys
On January 7, 2013, Green signed with the Dallas Cowboys to a future/reserve contract. He was released on August 26.

Oakland Raiders
Green was signed to the Oakland Raiders practice squad on December 12, 2013. On December 30, the Raiders signed him to a futures contract. On June 5, 2014, Green decided to retire from football.

Personal life
He is the son of Hall of Fame Washington Redskins  cornerback Darrell Green. He has an older sister, Jerrell, and a younger sister, Joi. He presented his father for induction to the Hall of Fame in Canton in 2008. Jared is married to Joanna Green and they have four daughters, named Alana Green (age 9), Bailey Green (age 7) and Cori Green (age 5).

References

External links
 Southern Jaguars bio

1989 births
Living people
African-American Christian clergy
American Christian clergy
Carolina Panthers players
Dallas Cowboys players
Oakland Raiders players
Oakton High School alumni
People from Chantilly, Virginia
People from Ashburn, Virginia
Virginia Cavaliers football players
21st-century African-American people
20th-century African-American people